The Whataroa River, sometimes the Wataroa River, is a river in the southern West Coast region of New Zealand's South Island. Its source is in the Southern Alps and it flows north and northwest, passing the township of Whataroa on the eastern side before reaching the Tasman Sea just south of Abut Head.

Recreation
Whitewater rafting takes place on the river as an adventure tourism activity.  Access to the upper reaches of the river for rafting is either via hiking or helicopter. The river also flows through areas used for tramping and climbing.

References 

Westland District
Rivers of the West Coast, New Zealand
Rivers of New Zealand